Beyond Calculation is the second studio album by noise rock duo The Austerity Program, released in 2014 through their very own Controlled Burn Records. Upon its initial release, the album received warm reception among music critics and was ranked twelfth on Rolling Stone's 20 Best Metal Albums of 2014.

History
In 2012, Hydra Head Records, the band's former label, announced that they had to drop some artists from their label due to financial reasons, thus causing the band to leave the label. Hydra Head would subsequently fold and stop producing music later that year. After leaving Hydra Head, the band decided to create their own Independent record label, which they titled Controlled Burn Records. The album was recorded during November 2013 at Kerguelen Studio, a recording studio the band built.

Track listing

Personnel

Performers
Thad Calabrese - Bass
Justin Foley - Guitar, Vocals
Drum machine - Percussion

Production
The Austerity Program - Music, Recording
John Golden - Mastering

References

2014 albums
The Austerity Program albums